Bob Ringwood (born 25 November 1946) is a British costume designer who has been nominated for two Academy Awards. He is perhaps best known for designing the Stillsuits in David Lynch's Dune (1984) and supervising the fabrication of the Batsuit used in Tim Burton's Batman (1989).

Oscars
Both nominations were in the category of Best Costume Design.

 60th Academy Awards - Nominated for Empire of the Sun. Lost to The Last Emperor .
 77th Academy Awards - Nominated for Troy. Lost to The Aviator.

Selected filmography
 Excalibur (1981)
 Dune (1984)
 Empire of the Sun (1987)
 Batman (1989)
 Alien 3 (1992)
 Batman Returns (1992)
 Demolition Man (1993)
 The Shadow (1994)
 Batman Forever (1995)
 Alien Resurrection (1997)
 A.I. Artificial Intelligence (2001)
 Star Trek: Nemesis (2002)
 The Time Machine (2002)
 Troy (2004)

References

External links
 

1946 births
Living people
British costume designers
Designers from London